Inayat Khan may refer to:

 Enayat Khan (1895–1938), sitar and surbahar player
 Inayat Hussain Khan (1849–1919), Indian classical vocalist
 Inayat Khan (cricketer), Pakistani cricketer
 Inayat Khan (historian), Mughal historian, author of Shah Jahan-náma
 Inayat Ollah Khan Niazi, Pakistan Army officer

Indian Sufi dynasty

 Inayat Khan (1882–1927), Universal Sufism and founder of the Sufi Order International
 Noor Inayat Khan (1914–1944), daughter of Inayat Khan
 Hidayat Inayat Khan (1917–2016), son of Inayat Khan
 Vilayat Inayat Khan (1916–2004), son of Inayat Khan
 Zia Inayat Khan (born 1971), grandson of Inayat Khan
 Fazal Inayat-Khan (1942–1990), grandson of Inayat Khan

See also 
 Inayatullah (disambiguation)
 Inayat